The Kuayue Chana V5 is a microvan produced by Chongqing Kuayue Automobile Co.,Ltd of Changan Automobile under the Kuayue sub-brand.

Overview

The model was originally sold under the Xinbao series of Chana as the Xinbao V5 (长安新豹V5) as of 2015, and was later renamed to  be sold under the Kuayue brand.  

The Kuayue Chana V5 is a 6-door van featuring a 2-piece tail gate and 4 hinged doors on the side for occupants. The V5 is available as a passenger van or a panel van and can seat from 2 to 5 occupants.

The V5 is powered by an 64 kW (87hp) 1.2 liter naturally aspirated engine with 109Nm of torque at 3200rpm mated to a 5-speed manual transmission. A top of the trim variant powered by a 82 kW (112hp) 1.5 liter inline-4 engine with 142Nm of torque is also available. Prices for the V5 ranges from 42,800 yuan to 46,600 yuan as of 2014.

Electric variant
An electric panel van version is also available for the logistics industry in China. The electric variant is powered by a choice of two 60kW and 380N·m electric motors and a 70kW and 380N·m electric motor with a selection between a 48.5kWh battery or a 41.86kWh battery with a range of 280km.

Kuayue Kuayuewang X5
The Kuayue Kuayuewang X5 is the truck variant produced by Chongqing Kuayue Automobile Co.,Ltd and sold under the Changan Kuayue sub-brand. The Kuayuewang X5 shares the same front end design as the V5 and is available as single cab and double cab variants with the cargo area available as a sealed box, a standard drop side bed and a heavy duty long wheelbase model.

2017 facelift
The Chana V5 and Kuayuewang X5 received a facelift in 2017 updating the front grilles and bumper to a cleaner design.

References

Kuayue Chana V5
Trucks
Vans
Microvans
Rear-wheel-drive vehicles
Cars of China
Cars introduced in 2013
Production electric cars